The 1887 Halloween tropical storm was a late-season tropical cyclone that caused significant damage along the East Coast of the United States during Halloween of 1887. The sixteenth tropical storm of the annual hurricane season, it formed from an area of disturbed weather over the Gulf of Mexico on October 29. The storm later came ashore along the west coast of Florida. After crossing the state, it produced severe thunderstorms along the North Carolina–Virginia coastline before becoming extratropical on November 1. The extratropical system intensified into the equivalent of a Category 1 hurricane on the modern-day Saffir–Simpson Hurricane Scale. It eventually dissipated on November 6, shortly after hitting northwest France.

The storm affected the town of Norfolk, where it became the most damaging storm since 1879. Despite the damage inland, the storm is best known for the unusually high number of shipwrecks and maritime incidents it caused. One ship, a schooner called the Manantico, capsized, killing the captain and one of its crew members. Three other ships were driven ashore on Virginia beaches from False Cape to Cape Henry, and numerous others were put in danger.

Meteorological history
The storm originated from an area of disturbed weather that had persisted in the Gulf of Mexico during late October 1887, outside the area of coastal stations. On October 29, the disturbance completed tropical cyclogenesis and became the sixteenth tropical storm of the season. After forming, the storm was located 200 miles (320 km) northwest of Key West and began moving east-northeastward, making landfall on the Florida Peninsula. It crossed land and emerged over water within the next eight hours while weakening. Upon crossing the state, it paralleled the East Coast for two days while restrengthening. Shortly after moving away from land, it became extratropical.

The extratropical cyclone moved away from the coast and strengthened to the equivalent of a Category 1 hurricane on the modern-day Saffir-Simpson Hurricane Scale on November 1. It began a weakening trend on November 2 while taking a wavering path across the north Atlantic Ocean. On November 4, the cyclone started a general east-southeast motion, passing near the southwest coasts of Ireland and Great Britain. It made landfall on the Cotentin Peninsula of France on November 6 and dissipated, although one proposed track, which is a modified track that differs from the official record due to new evidence or theory, was given by Charles Mitchell that showed the cyclone executing a counter-clockwise loop over northwest France until dissipating the storm on November 8.

Impact
In its formative stages, the storm was responsible for causing rain from the Rio Grande Valley along the Gulf Coast to Florida. As it  strengthened off the East Coast, the storm caused damage in various towns. Unusually, reports of hail and snow were also received from these locations. Telegraph poles were snapped on Bodie Island and south of Little Kinnakeet, affecting communication. The worst land-based impact from the storm was in Virginia. Cape Henry was hit with a combination of wind, rain, and blown sand on October 31 and communications between Cape Henry and Norfolk were lost. In Norfolk, the storm was the longest-lasting and most damaging since the Great Beaufort Hurricane of 1879. The storm conditions made beaches in the area so hazardous that they were watched day and night.

Despite causing damage along the East Coast, the storm is best known for causing a record number of maritime incidents. Numerous ships were caught in the storm from October 30, when the steamship Claribel reported gale-force winds, to November 6, when another steamship, the Australia, reported stormy weather. One ship, the brig Osseo, was caught in the storm on November 1 and became flooded. Although the pumps were manned, the water level inside the ship soon reached . After being carried away by a wave, the distressed ship was spotted by the Camalia, which rescued the crew and brought them to port. Another vessel, the Wyonoka, spotted a sunken schooner with its five crew grasping the mast and ropes: they were also rescued. In addition, four ships were deemed total losses after being beached in Virginia. The first was the Mary D. Cranmer, which was ripped from its cables and stranded near Cape Henry. Shortly after the rescue of the crew of the Cranmer another ship, the Carrie Holmes, was found beached. The ship had been driven so far up the beach that its crew were able to jump and wade to safety.

A third ship, the Manantico also crashed into shore due to a combination of the storm and human error in which the captain confused Cape Henry with Cape Charles after spotting another schooner. The Manantico was also where the two deaths associated with the storm occurred. The first was when a cook on the ship was crushed to death by the cargo of lumber being hauled by the ship. The ship was then pushed towards a sand bar. The captain, who had stayed high on the starboard side for safety, began climbing down to slip the ship cables, but the ship made a sudden stop. This flung the captain into the water, and he drowned. Both bodies were found after the storm and were very disfigured. The captain was sent to Middletown, Connecticut for interment while the body of the cook was buried on the beach. The final ship was the Harriet Thomas, which was the schooner spotted by the Manantico. After beaching, the crew managed to get a rope to shore where fishermen had tied the other end. The crew were able to climb ashore, although the captain had to be rescued via alternate means due to being too heavy for this method. The ship was written off as a $7000 (1887 USD) loss. Although all four ships were beached, due to the loss of communications, only one wreck – that of the Mary D. Cranmer – was reported in the Norfolk Virginian newspaper. As a result, news of the two deaths from the Manantico were initially unreported.

See also

List of Atlantic hurricanes
1887 Atlantic hurricane season

References

1887 Halloween
1887 Halloween
1887 Halloween
1887 Halloween
1880s Atlantic hurricane seasons
1887 natural disasters in the United States
1887 meteorology
Halloween events